Furth an der Triesting is a town in the district of Baden in Lower Austria in Austria.

Populations

References

External links 

Cities and towns in Baden District, Austria
Gutenstein Alps